Underwoodia is a genus of ascomycete fungi in the order Pezizales. The widespread genus contained many species, beforre they were transferred to the Geomorium genus. The genus, described by Charles Horton Peck in 1890, honors mycologist Lucien Marcus Underwood.

Species
As accepted by Species Fungorum;
 Underwoodia columnaris 
 
Former species;
 U. beatonii  = Geomorium beatonii, Geomoriaceae
 U. campbellii  = Daleomyces phillipsii, Pezizaceae
 U. fuegiana  = Geomorium fuegianum, Geomoriaceae
 U. fuegiana var. cabrinii  = Geomorium fuegianum, Geomoriaceae
 U. singeri  = Geomorium singeri, Geomoriaceae
 U. singeri var. fulvostipitata  = Geomorium singeri, Geomoriaceae
 U. sparassoides  = Daleomyces phillipsii, Pezizaceae

References

External links

Pezizales genera
Pezizales